Taft Avenue station is a Manila Metro Rail Transit (MRT) station situated on Line 3 and is the line's only station in Pasay. Located at the intersection of Epifanio de los Santos Avenue (EDSA), one of Metro Manila's major thoroughfares, and Taft Avenue usually referred to as Pasay Rotonda or EDSA-Taft, it is the southern terminus of the line. The station is named after Taft Avenue, which is in turn named after former U.S. President and U.S. Chief Justice William Howard Taft, who served as Governor-General of the Philippines from 1901 to 1903.

It is one of five stations on the line where passengers can catch a train going in the opposite direction without paying a new fare due to the station's layout. The other four stations are Araneta Center-Cubao, Shaw Boulevard, Boni, Buendia, and Ayala. Excluding Araneta Center-Cubao station, it is also one of four stations on the line with its concourse level located above the platform. However, crowd control measures at the station currently discourage passengers from switching trains at the platform level.

The station's location as a terminus has helped create many businesses in the area, from the number of hotels and motels to restaurants and shops, with a good majority of them being a short walk from the station.

Nearby landmarks

The station is connected to Metropoint Mall and Saver's Square, both of which are popular with commuters; as well as Winston Lodge and a branch of Hotel Sogo, two of the many motels found along EDSA near the station. It is also the ideal stop for those continuing to Ninoy Aquino International Airport and Bay City including SM Mall of Asia, SMX Convention Center, Heritage Hotel, San Juan de Dios Hospital and College, and Manila Tytana College (formerly Manila Doctors College).

Transportation links
True to its name, Taft Avenue station is a major transportation hub. Many provincial bus lines, such as Victory Liner, Five Star Bus Company (serving Northern Luzon), Philtranco (serving Southern Luzon and the rest of the Philippines), and Genesis Transport (serving the provinces of Bataan and La Union), have bus terminals near the station. Buses and jeepneys from this station ply for various points in Metro Manila: Pasay, Muntinlupa (Sucat and Alabang), Parañaque (Bicutan and PITX), SM Mall of Asia, Taguig, Las Piñas, Manila, Caloocan, Makati, and Quezon City and the southern provinces of Cavite, Batangas, and Laguna. A nearby bus station of EDSA Carousel is located along EDSA across Taft Avenue.

Taft Avenue station serves as the transfer point for commuters riding the LRT Line 1 to either Baclaran or Roosevelt via a crossway to EDSA station.

A shuttle bus connects the station to the Terminal 3 of Manila International Airport (MIA).

Operating schedule
The station operates from 5:00 AM until 10:00 PM all days a week. It is closed for annual maintenance every Maundy Thursday, Good Friday, Black Saturday and Easter Sunday. At the discretion of its operators, it is also closed during All Saints' Day (November 1).

First / Last Train Service

Express Train Service

Note: This service was discontinued in 2014.

See also
List of rail transit stations in Metro Manila
Manila Metro Rail Transit System Line 3

References

Manila Metro Rail Transit System stations
Railway stations opened in 2000
Buildings and structures in Pasay